Thiruda Thirudi ( Male Thief and Female Thief) is a 2003 Indian Tamil-language romantic comedy film written and directed by debutant Subramaniam Siva. The film stars Dhanush, Chaya Singh, Karunas, Manikka Vinayagam, and Krishna. This film was a low-budget production, and the soundtrack  was composed by Dhina. The film released on 5 September 2003. It was remade in Telugu as Donga Dongadi and in Kannada as Sakha Sakhi. The film was a commercial success.

Plot
Vasudevan aka Vasu belongs to a middle-class family and is irresponsible and untrustworthy. Vijayalakshmi aka Viji is from a traditional Telugu family and is an ambitious and career-oriented girl. Vasu and Viji meet up, and one day, he follows her on her two-wheeler. She is so bugged by him that she fails to notice a vehicle ahead. Though he cautions her, she ends up having an accident. Vasu admits her in the hospital, but Viji holds him responsible for her accident. Both of them are at loggerheads and bicker constantly. Vasu leaves for Chennai in order to prove himself to his father, who is constantly criticising his irresponsibility. Meanwhile, Viji gets a job at Chennai and moves into the same apartment complex as Vasu. The rest of the story follows Vasu's progress and deals with relationship between Vasu and Viji and whether or not their attitude for each other changed. Viji falls in love with Vasu, but he acts to hate her because she made him and his whole family separated. So in the middle, something happens, and they both end up loving each other. Vasu also got back together with his family.

Cast

 Dhanush as Vasudevan aka Vasu
 Chaya Singh as Vijayalakshmi aka Viji (Voice dubbed by Mahalakshmi Kannan)
 Karunas as 'Rockfort' Chandru
 Manikka Vinayagam as Karthikeyan, Vasu's father
 Krishna as Krishna, Vasu's brother
 Meghna Nair as Omanakutty
 Delhi Ganesh as Vasudevan's Boss (guest appearance)
 Sujee as Pooja
 Kousalya Senthamarai as Vasu's mother
 Kambar Jayaraman as Viji's father
 Sri Vidhya as Chandru's sister
 Harish Adhithya as Kumar (Chandru's friend)
 Master Udayaraj as a naughty boy

Soundtrack
The soundtrack was composed by Dhina.The track "Manmadha Rasa" became popular.

Release
A critic from Screen noted "it was an offbeat love story marked by good performance by Dhanush which makes it a breezy entertainer."

The low-budget film was the second most successful film of the year. It was later remade in Telugu as Donga Dongadi, where Manikka Vinayagam would reprise his role as the male protagonist's father. It was also remade in Kannada as Sakha Sakhi.

References

External links

2003 films
Films shot in Tiruchirappalli
Tamil films remade in other languages
2000s Tamil-language films
Films set in Tiruchirappalli
2003 directorial debut films
Films directed by Subramaniam Siva